Mercy Apondi Obiero born on August 27, 1978, in Nairobi is a Kenyan weightlifter.

Obiero's brother David introduced her to weightlifting in 1999. Before then, she had played hockey. Alongside Mercy, David competed at the 2002 and 2006 Commonwealth Games.

Mercy Obiero made her international debut at the 2002 Commonwealth Games in Manchester where she failed to get a result in the 48 kg weight class. Four years later, she participated at the Commonwealth Games in Melbourne, where she finished in seventh place in the 63 kg weight class.  In 2010, she competed at the Commonwealth Games in Delhi and finished in fifth position in the 69 kg weight class. Obiero competed at the 2012 Summer Olympics in London where she received an unused quota spot. Obiero finished 13th in the 69 kg category, but later was moved up to 11th position (last among completed lifters), due to disqualifications. Her total was 181 kg.  By competing in London, Obiero was the first Kenyan woman weightlifter at the Olympics and the second from Africa after Uganda’s Irene Ajambo. At the 2014 Commonwealth Games in Glasgow, Obiero finished in eighth place in the women's 69 kg weight class.

By 2020, Obiero had retired from competition, and became a trainer for one of her daughters and a granddaughter.

References

Kenyan female weightlifters
Weightlifters at the 2012 Summer Olympics
Olympic weightlifters of Kenya
1978 births
Living people
African Games bronze medalists for Kenya
African Games medalists in weightlifting
Competitors at the 2015 African Games
Sportspeople from Nairobi
Weightlifters at the 2002 Commonwealth Games
Weightlifters at the 2006 Commonwealth Games
Weightlifters at the 2010 Commonwealth Games
Weightlifters at the 2014 Commonwealth Games
Commonwealth Games competitors for Kenya
20th-century Kenyan women
21st-century Kenyan women